Balmory Hall is a category A listed Victorian Italianate mansion located near Ascog in the Isle of Bute, Scotland, just west of Ascog House. The hall is set within  of gardens. It is run as a privately owned guesthouse and reportedly features a 7-course breakfast.

References

External links
Official site

Country houses in Argyll and Bute
Isle of Bute
Category A listed buildings in Argyll and Bute
Listed houses in Scotland
Hotels in Argyll and Bute
Bed and breakfasts